Aroostook Centre Mall is a shopping mall in Presque Isle, Maine, USA. It opened on November 1, 1993. Shortly after its opening, the U.S. government announced the closing of nearby Loring Air Force Base, the region's largest employer.

The mall contains a J. C. Penney, the only remaining anchor store. Kmart closed in August 2016. Former anchors Sears and Staples closed in early 2015.  VIP Parts, Tires and Service moved into the Sears Automotive Center. Staples had opened in 2004, taking part of an anchor space previously occupied by Porteous. That Porteous store, closed in 2003, was the last in the chain.

The  building is the third largest enclosed shopping mall in Maine. In June 2001, it was sold for $10 million (less than half of the appraised value) to brothers Eddie & Ralph Sitt of New York City.

In August 2009, the Mall updated its energy technology by moving towards more efficient heating, cooling, and ventilation systems. Sears announced the closing of its Presque Isle store in late 2014. Deb Shops closed in 2014, part of a nationwide liquidation. On January 19, 2015, the Maine Jump, a family entertainment center for children 12 and younger, closed, citing high rent and costs of doing business in the area. In early February 2015 the Mall added a new Coin and Hobby supply shop, Central Lakes Coin and Currency. As of 2017, the existing space where Sears used to be is being renovated for the retail store Harbor Freight Tools. In October 2017, the Mall was scheduled to be auctioned off.  With no bidder found, Wells Fargo took over the mall for $4 million.

References

External links
 Official Website

Shopping malls in Maine
Shopping malls established in 1993
Tourist attractions in Aroostook County, Maine
Economy of Aroostook County, Maine
Buildings and structures in Presque Isle, Maine
1993 establishments in Maine
Kohan Retail Investment Group